Michael Ryan (19 December 1941 – 7 November 2017) was an Australian hurdler. He competed in the men's 400 metres hurdles at the 1964 Summer Olympics.

References

External links
 

1941 births
2017 deaths
Athletes (track and field) at the 1964 Summer Olympics
Australian male hurdlers
Olympic athletes of Australia
Place of birth missing
20th-century Australian people
21st-century Australian people